Hyeonjong is the temple name of several Korean kings. It can refer to:

 Hyeonjong of Goryeo (1009–1031)
 Hyeonjong of Joseon (1659–1674)

Temple name disambiguation pages